Da Possessed is a 2014 Filipino horror comedy film directed by Joyce Bernal, and starring Vhong Navarro and Solenn Heussaff. The film, produced and distributed by Star Cinema officially premiered in the Philippines on April 19, 2014. It is a remake of the Indian Tamil-language film Muni 2: Kanchana. In addition, Da Possessed and its director Joyce Bernal's fourth and last film where Navarro is the lead star after Mr. Suave (2003), D' Anothers (2005) and Agent X44 (2007).

The premiere earned  on Black Saturday.

Plot
Many years ago, 3 circus landowners were killed after they refused to sell their land. They were buried on that same lot.

The mother-reliant and weakling Ramon (Vhong Navarro) is forced to work as a landscape artist to pay off their family's debt. In his work field, he meets the lovable femme fatal boss Anna (Solenn Heussaff), who he falls in love head over heels with. Working hard as he tries to impress, Ramon unknowingly digs the graveyard of three victims of injustice whose souls begin to haunt and possess Ramon's body for vengeance; thus ruining his courtship and eventual relationship with Anna. Meanwhile, to prove the purest of his intentions, Ramon needs to stand up for Anna against her father Don Demetrio (Joey Marquez) who is a syndicate leader. But because of Ramon's cowardice, this comes as a major challenge, on top of the disturbance brought by the three ghosts headed by Anastacio "Chemerut" Balbitero, Jr. (John Lapus). As Ramon tries to solve the mystery behind these hauntings, he discovers that ghosts are trying to revenge against Don Demetrio. Ramon, in able to save himself from the possession was compelled to work with the ghosts who are seeking for justice. As Ramon struggles to fight for love and justice, he also learns the true meaning of courage which leads him into peacefully serving justice to the three ghosts and at the same time, save himself and Anna from the impending danger that Don Demetrio poses on them.

Cast

Main cast
Vhong Navarro as Ramoncito "Ramon" Villamayor
Solenn Heussaff as Anna Ignacio

Supporting cast
Aaliyah Belmoro as Anya Balbitero
Beverly Salviejo as Belen Villamayor
Empoy Marquez as Dado Balbitero
Joey Marquez as Demetrio "Don Demetrio" Demetrio
Efren Reyes as Atty. Joey Reynaldo
John Lapus as Anastacio "Chemerut" Balbitero, Jr.
Joy Viado† as Aunt Bless
Smokey Manaloto as Berting 
Matet de Leon as Marie
Isabel "Lenlen" Frial as Michelle
Rafhael Lenterno as Ryan
Mathew Barrios as "Gov. balbon"
Josh de Guzman as Young Ramon

Special participation
Dominic Ochoa as Arnel Ignacio, Jr.

Development

Production
The film is Navarro's movie comeback after Bulong in 2011. It was first announced in November 2013 and started shooting in December 2013. However, Navarro got involved of the mauling incident that happened on January 22, 2014 that the filming was postponed. After recovering from serious injuries, Navarro resumed filming in February 2014, amid his controversial legal battle in relation to a mauling incident.

Before Heussaff, there are plans of having two other leading ladies for Navarro. The first is Angel Locsin, but then 
it was changed to Ellen Adarna. However, the role ended up going to Heussaff, creating controversies. There is a claim that Vhong had been uncomfortable at the thought of working with Adarna, who admitted to being good friends with Cedric Lee, the main suspect of the mauling incident. Nevertheless, Navarro states that he does not know anything about changes in casting, and he is willing to work with her in the future.

Promotions
On March 29, 2014, the first official full-length trailer is released on YouTube. Few weeks later, the official theme song of the movie accompanied by a music video is released. The song entitled "Da Vhong Song" is released by producer Star Cinema and performed by Vhong Navarro.

See also
 List of ghost films

References

External links
 Da Possessed official website
 

2014 films
Star Cinema films
Regal Entertainment films
Philippine ghost films
Films about spirit possession
2010s Tagalog-language films
Filipino-language films
Philippine comedy horror films
Horror film remakes
Philippine haunted house films
Philippine remakes of foreign films
2010s English-language films
Films directed by Joyce Bernal